Anton Altmann (1808–1871) was an Austrian landscape painter.

Life

Altmann, was born in Vienna on 4 June 1808. His father, also called Anton, and his grandfather Joseph were both painters. He studied from nature, and under the instruction of Mössmer at the Academy. After being instructor in drawing to Count Apponyi in Hungary, he settled in Vienna, and became famous as a landscape painter. He died there in 1871.

Works
Among his most important works are the following:
Cloister of the Convent 'Maria Schein,' in Bohemia. 1838.
Forest Scene. 1840.
Marshy Landscape. 1846.
Evening Landscape. 1847.
Spring In a Forest. 1851.
The Mill. 1851.

Altmann executed landscapes in water-colour; and also etched from his own designs.

References

Sources
 

19th-century Austrian painters
Austrian male painters
1808 births
1871 deaths
Artists from Vienna
Academy of Fine Arts Vienna alumni
19th-century Austrian male artists